Aruamu a.k.a. Mikarew (Mikarup, Makarup, Makarub), also Ariawiai (Mikarew-Ariaw), is a Ramu language spoken in Mikarew village of Yawar Rural LLG, Madang Province, Papua New Guinea.

References

Misegian languages
Languages of Madang Province